The Wentworth Senior Masters was a men's professional golf tournament on the European Seniors Tour from 1997 to 2007.

The first tournament was won by multi-major winner Gary Player. It was staged at the Wentworth Club beyond the western fringe of London, which has the headquarters of the PGA European Tour European Seniors Tour Championship, as the Seniors Tour's fixed location tournament.

It was played on the Edinburgh Course. The two European Tour tournaments at the club (the corporate-sponsored PGA Championship and the World Play Championship) were played over the West Course. In 2007 the prize fund was £250,000.

Winners

External links
Coverage on the European Seniors Tour's official site

Former European Senior Tour events
Golf tournaments in England
Sport in Surrey
Recurring sporting events established in 1997
Recurring sporting events disestablished in 2007
1997 establishments in England
2007 disestablishments in England